The Confederate Farmers Party was a political party in Myanmar registered with the Union Election Commission (UEC). It was founded on 2 July 2015 by a group of farmers in Bago Region. The party stated that its objective was to lift the socio-economic pressure placed on farmers by the Burmese government, and that it would work with any other organisation or political party that shared its goals and values.

The UEC announced on 20 August 2019 that the party had dissolved due to internal disputes.

References

2015 establishments in Myanmar
Political parties established in 2015
Political parties disestablished in 2019
Political parties in Myanmar